Garching is an U-Bahn station in Garching on the U6.

See also
List of Munich U-Bahn stations

References

External links

Munich U-Bahn stations
Railway stations in Germany opened in 2006
Garching bei München